By-elections to the 18th Canadian Parliament were held to fill vacancies in the House of Commons of Canada between the 1935 federal election and the 1940 federal election. The Liberal Party of Canada led a majority government for the 18th Canadian Parliament.

31 vacant seats were filled through by-elections.

See also
List of federal by-elections in Canada

Sources
 Parliament of Canada–Elected in By-Elections 

1940 elections in Canada
1939 elections in Canada
1938 elections in Canada
1937 elections in Canada
1936 elections in Canada
1935 elections in Canada
18th